İzzet Safer (born 10 July 1990) is a Turkish sprinter. He competed in the men's 4 × 100 metres relay at the 2016 Summer Olympics.

References

1990 births
Living people
Turkish male sprinters
Olympic athletes of Turkey
Athletes (track and field) at the 2016 Summer Olympics
Place of birth missing (living people)
Mediterranean Games bronze medalists for Turkey
Mediterranean Games medalists in athletics
Athletes (track and field) at the 2013 Mediterranean Games
21st-century Turkish people